B. J. or BJ Ward may refer to:

 B. J. Ward (actress) (born 1944), American actress
 B. J. Ward (American football) (born 1981), American football player
 BJ Ward (poet) (born 1967), American poet